Sandawana Football Club is a Lesotho football club based in Mpharane.
It is based in the city of Makheka, Thaba-Tseka District in the region Thaba-Tseka District.

The team currently plays in Lesotho Second Division.

In 2014 the club was renamed from Mpharane Celtics to Sandawana.

Stadium
Currently the team plays at the 1,000 capacity St. Michaels Stadium.

Performance in CAF competitions
Lesotho Premier League: 2011–2013
Lesotho Second Division: ????–2011, 2013–

References

External links
Soccerway
VFLnet
Weltfussballarchiv

Football clubs in Lesotho